Thage Edvin Gerhard Peterson (born 24 September 1933) is a Swedish politician (Social Democrat).

Peterson was one of the leading Swedish Social Democrats in the 1980s and 1990s. He was a member of parliament from 1971 to 1998, its speaker from 1988 to 1991, and served in several ministerial posts from 1975 to 1976, 1982 to 1988 and 1994 to 1998, most notably as Minister for Industry from 1982 to 1988 and as Minister for Defence from 1994 to 1997.

Education and early career
Peterson worked as an agricultural labourer from 1947 to 1951. He then studied at a folk high school from 1951 to 1953 and studied social work at the South Sweden Social Institute in Lund, where he graduated in 1957.

He worked for the People's House national organisation from 1958 to 1964 and was its chief executive from 1967 to 1971. From 1964 to 1967 he was the national secretary and vice chairman of the Swedish Social Democratic Youth League.

Political career
Peterson was first elected a member of parliament in 1971 and served as state secretary in the prime minister's office from 1971 to 1975. From 1975 to 1976 he was minister without portfolio, responsible for government coordination, in the Palme I Cabinet. When the Social Democrats returned to power following the 1982 election, Peterson was made Minister for Industry, and remained on this post until 1988, in the Palme II Cabinet and the Carlsson I Cabinet. In addition, he briefly served as Minister for Justice in 1988 following the resignation of Anna-Greta Leijon.

From 1988 to 1991 he was Speaker of the Parliament of Sweden.

Following the 1994 election, he returned to the Carlsson III Cabinet as Minister for Defence, and remained in this post until 1997. From 1997 to 1998 he was minister in the prime minister's office.

Peterson was awarded the Illis quorum in 1998.

References

|-

1933 births
Members of the Riksdag from the Social Democrats
Speakers of the Riksdag
Swedish Ministers for Industry
Swedish Ministers for Justice
Swedish Ministers for Defence
Recipients of the Illis quorum
Living people